Pelycops is a genus of parasitic flies in the family Tachinidae. There is one described species in Pelycops, P. darwini.

Distribution
Argentina, Chile

References

Dexiinae
Diptera of South America
Tachinidae genera
Monotypic Brachycera genera
Taxa named by John Merton Aldrich